The Manipur white-toothed rat (Berylmys manipulus) is a species of rodent in the family Muridae.

The Manipur white-toothed rat is found in northeastern India, northern and central Myanmar, and Yunnan province of China (west of the Salween River). In India, it is found in Golaghat, Assam; the Kekrima Hills and Naga Hills of Nagaland; Bishenpur, Senapati, and Imphal districts of Manipur.

References

Berylmys
Rats of Asia
Rodents of China
Rodents of Southeast Asia
Mammals described in 1916
Taxa named by Oldfield Thomas
Taxonomy articles created by Polbot